Hugo Christopher Luke Rawlinson (born 14 April 1988) is an English cricketer. Rawlinson is a right-handed batsman who bowls right-arm medium pace. He was born in Lambeth, London to the cricketer John Rawlinson, and was educated at Eton College.

While studying for his degree at Durham University, Rawlinson made his first-class debut for Durham UCCE against Derbyshire.  He made two further first-class appearances for the university in 2008, against Durham and Lancashire, both in 2008.  In his three first-class matches, he scored just 15 runs at an average of 3.75, with a high score of 9.

References

External links
Hugo Rawlinson at ESPNcricinfo
Hugo Rawlinson at CricketArchive

1988 births
Living people
People from Lambeth
Cricketers from Greater London
People educated at Eton College
Alumni of Durham University
English cricketers
Durham MCCU cricketers